, abbreviated as 駒大 Komadai, is one of the oldest universities in Japan. Its history starts in 1592, when a seminary was established to be a center of learning for the young monks of the Sōtō sect, one of the two main Zen Buddhist traditions in Japan.

The university in Tokyo campus comprises seven faculties and 17 departments with a total of around 16,000 students. Also for students who wish to pursue advanced studies, each department has a graduate school. It also has eleven research institutes and a Museum of Zen Buddhist Culture. Times Higher Education places Komazawa University in the 150+ bracket in its ranking of Japan's 200 best universities.

History

In brief

Chronology

Basic information

Campuses

Komazawa campus 
 Komazawa 1-23-1, Setagaya-ku, Tokyo-to (東京都 世田谷区 駒沢1-23-1)
This campus is next to Komazawa Olympic Park (the stadium of the 1964 Tokyo Olympics).
Access: Komazawa-daigaku Station (駒沢大学駅)

Futakotamagawa campus 
 Unane 1-1-1, Setagaya-ku, Tokyo-to (東京都 世田谷区 宇奈根1-1-1)
Access: Futako-Tamagawa Station (二子玉川駅)

Fukasawa campus 
 Fukasawa 6-8-18, Setagaya-ku, Tokyo-to (東京都 世田谷区 深沢6-8-18)
Access: Komazawa-daigaku Station (駒沢大学駅)

College Song 
 Words by Hakushū Kitahara, music by Kōsaku Yamada .

Education and research

Departments 
 Buddhist Studies
 Zen Buddhist Studies
 Buddhist Studies
 Literature
 Japanese Literature
 English and American Literature
 Geography
 Area and Culture Studies
 Environmental Science
 History
 Japanese History
 Foreign History
 Archaeology
 Philosophy
 Sociology
 Sociology
 Social Welfare
 Economics
 Economics
 Commerce
 Applied Economics
 Law
 Law
 Political Science
 Business Administration
 Business Administration
 Marketing Management
 Health Sciences
 Radiological Sciences
 Global Media Studies
 Global Media

Graduate programs 
 Arts and Sciences
 Buddhist Studies
 Japanese literature
 English and American Literature
 Geography
 History
 Japanese History
 European History
 History of East Asia
 Archaeology
 Sociology
 Psychology
 Psychology
 Certified Clinical Psychology
 Economics
 Commerce
 Law
 Public Law
 Private Law
 Business Administration
 Health Sciences
 Radiological Sciences
 Global Media Studies
 Global Media

Professional graduate programs 
 Judicial Studies (Law school)

Affiliated facilities

Institute 
 The Zen Institute
 The Institute of Zen Buddhism and Economics
 The Institute for Comparative Buddhist Literature
 The Institute of Legal Research
 The Research Institute for Applied Geography
 The Research Institute for Accounting
 The Institute of Mass Communication
 The Research Institute for Justice

Facilities 
 Komazawa campus
 246 Kaikan
 Community Care Center
 Futakotamagawa campus
 Fukasawa campus

Museum 
 The Museum of Zen Culture and History

Student life

Societies 
There are over 160 clubs and organizations in Komazawa University.

Ekiden 
The Komazawa University ekiden team won the "Hakone Ekiden" in 2000, 2002, 2003, 2004, 2005, 2008, 2021, and 2023. 
" Big Three collegiate ekiden competitions " (三大大学駅伝) are as follows:
Izumo Ekiden (出雲駅伝)
All-Japan Collegiate (Men's) Ekiden Championship (全日本大学駅伝)
 Hakone Ekiden (箱根駅伝)

Baseball 
The baseball team belongs to the " Tohto University Baseball League ". (東都大学野球リーグ)

Football 
The football team plays as one of the Kantō Collegiate Football League (:ja:関東大学サッカー連盟)

Others 
 Karate : 
 Boxing : 
 American football (" Blue Tide ") : " Kantoh Collegiate American Football Association " (関東学生アメリカンフットボール連盟)
 Ice hockey : 
 Basketball :
 Tennis : 
 Cheerleading (" Blue Jays ") : " Foundation of Japan Cheerleading Association " (日本チアリーディング協会)
 Cheerleading (" Blue Pegasus ") :
 Brass band : 
 Orchestra : 
 Chorus : 
 Rakugo :

Festivals 
 Autumn festival（Cultural festival (Japan)）
 Tenmasai（天馬祭）by Blue Pegasus（応援指導部ブルーペガス）

People

Presidents 
 Reirin Yamada
 Hakujyu Ui
 Kogen Mizuno

Professors

Alumni 
* Did not graduate.
 Dainin Katagiri (片桐 大忍), Sōtō Zen priest, founding abbot of the Minnesota Zen Center
 Kobun Chino Otogawa (乙川 弘文), Sōtō Zen priest
 Shōhaku Okumura (奥村 正博), Dōgenist
 Shunryu Suzuki (鈴木 俊隆), Sōtō Zen priest
 Soyu Matsuoka (松岡 操雄), Founder of Zen Buddhist Temple of Chicago
 Taizan Maezumi Rōshi (前角 博雄), Soto Zen priest
 Brian Victoria ,educator, Doctor of Philosophy, writer and Buddhist priest in the Sōtō Zen sect
 Yuko Okumura, Kesa descendent
 Noriaki Hakamaya (袴谷 憲昭), professor of Komazawa University
 Reirin Yamada (山田 霊林), professor, president
 Stanley Weinstein (スタンリー・ワインスタイン), honorary professor of Yale University
 Shiro Matsumoto (松本 史朗), professor of Komazawa University
 Sodō Mori (森 祖道), professor of Aichi Gakuin University
 William Bodiford (ウィリアム・ボディフォード), professor of University of California, Los Angeles
 Atsushi Watanabe (渡部 篤), member of the House of Representatives in the Diet
 Naoto Ohtsuki (大朏 直人), founder of Onkyo
 Masaru Kawaguchi (川口 勝), vice president of Bandai Namco Holdings, president of Bandai Spirits Co.
 Kazumasa Terada (寺田 和正), founder of Samantha Thavasa
 Hiroaki Ito (伊東 宏晃), president of Avex Management Inc.
 Shinji Hashimoto (橋本 真司), game producer)
 Katsuoki Enomoto (榎本 勝起), Announcer of Tokyo Broadcasting System Television
 Sen Odagiri (小田切 千), Announcer of NHK
 Heitaro Ohhama (大浜 平太郎), Commentator, Announcer of TV Tokyo
 Mitsuo Shindō (信藤 三雄), art director, photographer, film director and producer, music video director and calligraphist
 Tatsushi Ōmori (大森 立嗣), film director and actor
 Izuru Narushima (成島 出), scriptwriter and film director *
 Kenta Kiritani (桐谷 健太), actor *
 Takeo Nakahara (中原 丈雄), actor
 Yuma Nakayama (中山 優馬), actor *
 Kōhei Yamamoto (山本 康平), actor
 Daisuke Satō (佐藤 大輔), board game designer, novelist, and manga writer
 Hitoshi Okuda (奥田 ひとし), manga artist
 Yōsuke Takahashi (高橋 葉介), horror manga artist
 Michiru Jo (城 みちる), singer *
 Toshinobu Kubota (久保田 利伸), singer, songwriter, music producer
 Masatoshi Sato (佐藤 雅俊), Bassist, member of Acidman
 Shinji Wajima (和嶋 慎治), Guitarist and vocalist, member of Ningen Isu
 Hiroki Yasumoto (安元 洋貴), voice actor
 Suzuko Mimori (三森 すずこ), voice actor *
 Yūsei Oda (織田 優成), voice actor
 Toshihiko Seki (関 俊彦), voice actor
 Masaharu Satō (佐藤 正治), voice actor *
 Nobuo Tobita (飛田 展男), voice actor *
 Kinichi Hagimoto (萩本 欽一), comedian *
 Atsushi Fujita (藤田 敦史), long-distance runner
 Nao Kazami (風見 尚), long-distance runner, 100 km record holder
 Hajime Meshiai (飯合 肇), professional golfer
 Sanshiro Takagi (高木 三四郎), professional wrestler
 Satoshi Shimizu (清水 聡), professional boxer,|2012 London medalist
 Masayuki Ito (伊藤 雅雪), professional boxer, WBO featherweight champion
 Jun Uchida (内田 潤), football player
 Seiichiro Maki (巻 誠一郎), football player
 Yuki Maki (巻 佑樹), football player
 Masaki Chugo (中後 雅喜), football player 
 Masaki Fukai (深井 正樹), football player 
 Toshiya Miura (三浦 俊也), football manager
 Kiyoshi Nakahata (中畑 清), retired professional baseball player
 Shigekazu Mori (森 繁和), retired professional baseball player
 Hiromichi Ishige (石毛 宏典), retired professional baseball player
 Hisanori Takahashi (高橋 尚成), major League baseball pitcher
 Tsuyoshi Kawagishi (川岸 強), professional baseball pitcher
 Hisashi Takeda (武田 久), professional baseball pitcher
 Takahiro Arai (新井 貴浩), professional baseball player
 Makoto Majima (馬島 誠), ice sledge hockey player and para powerlifter
 and see: 
 
 List of Komazawa related people from Japanese Wikipedia

External relations

International exchanges 
 University of Exeter, UK
 Kingston University, UK
 University of Queensland, Australia
 Griffith University, Australia 
 University of California, Irvine, USA
 California State University, Los Angeles, USA
 University of Hawaii at Manoa, USA
 Arkansas Tech University, USA
 University of British Columbia, Canada
 University of Provence, France
 Peking University, China
 East China Normal University, China
 Tamkang University, Taiwan
 Dongguk University, South Korea
 Cairo University, Egypt

Agreements with other universities

Setagaya Six Universities Consortium 
Participants in the Setagaya 6 Universities Consortium (世田谷6大学コンソーシアム " Setagaya Roku Daigaku Konsōshiamu ") are as follows:
Kokushikan University
Seijo University
Showa Women's University
Tokyo University of Agriculture
Tokyo City University

Sister schools 
 Tohoku Fukushi University
 Aichi Gakuin University
 Tsurumi University
 Komazawa Women's University
They were also established by Soto sect.

Affiliated schools 
 Komazawa Senior High School
 Komazawa Tomakomai Senior High School

See also
 Komazawa University is known as one of Japan's four famous private universities. "NI-TO-KOMA-SEN" (日東駒専) is the abbreviation that refers to the four private universities in Tokyo.
" Nittokomasen "（日東駒専）are as follows:
 " 日 " (日本大学) : Nihon University
 " 東 " (東洋大学) : Toyo University
 " 駒 " (駒澤大学) : Komazawa University
 " 専 " (専修大学) : Senshu University
 Komazawa-daigaku Station
 Hanazono University, corresponding Rinzai university

References

External links
 
 ZEN, KOMAZAWA, 1592

 
Buddhism in Tokyo
Educational institutions established in 1925
Private universities and colleges in Japan
Buddhist universities and colleges in Japan
Soto Zen
American football in Japan
1925 establishments in Japan
Universities and colleges in Tokyo